Whirlpool is a 1959 British crime film directed by Lewis Allen and starring Juliette Gréco and O. W. Fischer.
The score from Ron Goodwin established him as a film composer.

It was shot at Pinewood Studios and on location in the Rhineland including Koblenz and Cologne. The film's sets were designed by the art director Jack Maxsted.

Plot summary
A beautiful girl Lora (Juliette Gréco) asks Rolph (O. W. Fischer) if she can travel on his barge down the Rhine. Rolph agrees to this and helps her to escape the clutches of murderer Herman (William Sylvester), who is obsessed with Lora.

The local police approach Rolph and ask him to work together with them to lure Herman on board the barge using Lora as bait. Herman manages to hide on board and then takes control of Rolph's barge using a gun he has. Rolph and Lora manage to overpower Herman and throw him overboard where he is dragged under the barge into one of the side paddles where he is killed.

Lora is a cynical person, believing that no one would ever do anything to help her out of just friendship due to the hard life she has had. At the end of the film, Lora leaves with the police,  while Rolph asks her to return to him one day to live with him on his barge on the European rivers.

Cast 
 Juliette Gréco as Lora 
 O. W. Fischer as Rolph
 Muriel Pavlow as Dina
 Marius Goring as Georg
 William Sylvester as Herman
 Richard Palmer as Derek
 Peter Illing as Braun
 Geoffrey Bayldon as Wendel
 Lily Kann as Mrs. Steen 
 Harold Kasket as Stiebel
 Victor Brooks as Riverman
 George Mikell as German Policeman
 Jack Sharp as Barge Man

Production
The film was originally known as Lorelei. Juliette Greco's signing was announced in August 1958. The same month Rank stated Hardy Kruger would play the male lead. However not long afterwards O.W. Fisher was cast in the lead. Fisher was then one of the biggest stars in Germany and this was his first English language film although he had meant to star in My Man Godfrey (1957) in the US. His fee was a reported ₤30,000. He was one of a number of German stars signed by the Rank organisation to star in films after the success of Kurger in The One That Got Away, others being Curt Jurgens in Ferry to Hong Kong, Kruger in Bachelor of Hearts and Horst Buchholz in Tiger Bay.

Filming started 1 September 1958 and took place at Pinewood Studios and Germany. 

Greco's sister and mother had spent the war in a concentration camp while Greco had been in a Paris prison. She said she "hated" the Germans but accepted a part in Whirlpool "because I wanted to kill that hate". 

However Greco clashed with Fisher during filming, saying "I have never been so insulted in my life as I have by this man Fisher. I would like to slap him in the face and knock him flat." Fisher, who was Austrian and did not serve in the army during the war, said in response, "Perhaps Miss Greco does not like me because I am a dedicated actor not interested in behaving like a film star, as she is. As an actress I think Miss Greco is a very good socialite."

In London, Greco later refused to attend a reception arranged by the German embassy in honour of the film.

Reception
Variety called it a "turgid drama with indifferent acting, flat dialog and uneven lensing."

The Guardian called it "a dull thriller".

References

External links 
 
 
 
Whirlpool at Letterbox DVD

British crime films
1959 crime films
1959 films
Films directed by Lewis Allen
Films shot in Germany
Films set in West Germany
Films shot at Pinewood Studios
Seafaring films
1950s English-language films
1950s British films